Chrysoclista cambiella is a species of moth of the family Agonoxenidae. It is found in the United States (Oregon, Idaho and Montana) and Canada (British Columbia and Alberta).

The wingspan is about 12 mm for males and 13 mm for females. The forewing ground colour is bright reddish orange, broadly edged with shining blackish brown with greenish and purplish reflections. There is a wing pattern of three round tubercular, pale golden metallic spots with strong purplish reflection. The hindwings are dark greyish brown with strong purplish reflection.

The larvae feed on Salix species. They bore in the cambium of their host plant.

References

Moths described in 1915
Agonoxeninae
Moths of North America